The Bishop of Shrewsbury is the Ordinary of the Roman Catholic Diocese of Shrewsbury in the Province of Birmingham, England.

The see is in the town of Shrewsbury where the bishop's seat is located at the Cathedral Church of Our Lady Help of Christians and Saint Peter of Alcantara.

The diocese of Shrewsbury was erected on 29 September 1850 from parts of the Vicariates Apostolic of the Central, Lancashire and Welsh Districts.

The current incumbent is the Right Reverend Mark Davies who succeeded as the 11th Bishop of Shrewsbury on 1 October 2010. He had previously been appointed the Coadjutor Bishop of Shrewsbury by the Holy See on 22 December 2009 and ordained a bishop on 22 February 2010.

List of Bishops of the Roman Catholic Diocese of Shrewsbury

References

 
Roman Catholic Diocese of Shrewsbury